Murraya paniculata, commonly known as orange jasmine, orange jessamine, china box or mock orange, is a species of shrub or small tree in the family Rutaceae and is native to South Asia, Southeast Asia and Australia. It has smooth bark, pinnate leaves with up to seven egg-shaped to elliptical leaflets, fragrant white or cream-coloured flowers and oval, orange-red berries containing hairy seeds.

Description
Murraya paniculata is a tree that typically grows to a height of  but often flowers and forms fruit as a shrub, and has smooth pale to whitish bark.

Taxonomy
Orange jasmine was first formally described in 1767 by Carl Linnaeus who gave it the name Chalcas paniculata in Mantissa Plantarum. In 1820, William Jack changed the name to Murraya paniculata in his book Descriptions of Malayan Plants [Malayan Miscellanies].

Distribution and habitat
Murraya paniculata grows in rainforest, often as an understorey shrub in vine thickets, including behind beaches. It is native to South and Southeast Asia, China and Australasia, while the distribution area extends from Pakistan via India, Sri Lanka and southern China to Taiwan, the Philippines, where it is called kamuníng, the Ryūkyū Islands and the Mariana Islands, to the south via Malaysia and Indonesia to New Guinea and parts of Australia. In Australia, it is native to the Kimberley region of Western Australia, northern parts of the Northern Territory, and parts of Queensland. The species has been naturalised in other places, sometimes becoming an invasive weed, including on many Pacific islands. In Queensland, it is regarded as different from the cultivated form Murraya paniculata 'Exotica', which is regarded as one of the most invasive plant species in southeast Queensland.

Uses
Murraya paniculata is cultivated as an ornamental tree or hedge because of its hardiness, wide range of soil tolerance (M. paniculata may grow in alkaline, clayey, sandy, acidic and loamy soils), and is suitable for larger hedges. The plant flowers throughout the year and produces small, fragrant flower clusters which attract bees, while the fruits attract small frugivorous birds.

Propagation
The orange jessamine is sexually propagated by its seeds. The fruits are eaten by birds, which then pass the seeds out in their feces. It may also be asexually propagated by softwood cuttings.

Diseases
M. paniculata is vulnerable to soil nematodes, scales, sooty mold and whiteflies.

It is the preferred host to the insect pest Diaphorina citri, the citrus psyllid. This psyllid is the vector for the citrus greening disease.

Gallery

References

paniculata
Flora of tropical Asia
Flora of Western Australia
Flora of the Northern Territory
Flora of Queensland
Sapindales of Australia
Taxa named by Carl Linnaeus
Plants described in 1767